Faces of War (originally known as Outfront II, or Behind Enemy Lines 2) is a real-time strategy and real-time tactics war video game developed by Ukrainian developer Best Way and published by Russian publisher 1C Company. The game is a sequel to 2004's Soldiers: Heroes of World War II. Whereas Soldiers had the player controlling a handful of squad members alone in enemy territory, Faces of War engages the player and his squad in massive battles fighting alongside AI controlled squads. The game features a full 3D engine allowing the player to have much greater control over the camera compared to Soldiers. The engine also allows nearly full environmental destruction. The developers have also improved the multiplayer options from the last game, with many more modes and options. The game was released in Russia on September 8, 2006 and North America for PC on September 12, 2006.

Game scenario writers include Alexander Zorich.

Development
The game was developed using the GEM Engine, allowing more destructible items and better camera movement than it's predecessor.

Ubisoft released a single player demo of the game in July 2006. A multiplayer demo was released a few days before the official release in September. Two patches were released for the game over December 2006 and January 2007.

Faces of War's sequel Men of War was released in 2009 by 1C Company.

Reception

The game received "mixed or average reviews" according to video game review aggregator Metacritic.  It won "Best of Show" at the 2006 Russian Game Developer's Conference.

References

External links
Official Faces of War website

2006 video games
1C Company games
Cooperative video games
Real-time tactics video games
Video game sequels
Video games developed in Ukraine
Windows games
Windows-only games
World War II video games
Multiplayer and single-player video games